José Antonio Martínez Suárez (2 October 1925 – 17 August 2019) was an Argentine film director and screenwriter. He worked on more than 20 films between 1949 and 2003. He was the brother of actresses Mirtha and Silvia Legrand.

Filmography
 The Dixielanders: ¿No es ella dulce? - 1956
 Altos Hornos Zapla - 1956
 El Crack - 1960
 Responsibility (Dar la cara) - 1962
 Viaje de una noche de verano - 1965
 El hombre de la víbora - 1965
 Los Chantas - 1975
 Yesterday's Guys Used No Arsenic (Los Muchachos de antes no usaban arsénico) - 1976
 El desafío - 1978
 Nights Without Moons and Suns (Noches sin lunas ni soles) - 1984

References

External links
 

1925 births
2019 deaths
Argentine film directors
Argentine screenwriters
Male screenwriters
Argentine male writers
Argentine film producers
People from General López Department
Burials at La Chacarita Cemetery